Neena Beber is an American writer of plays and television screenplays.  She is also a television producer.

Beber wrote the sixth episode of the TBS comedy The Detour. Her short (10-minute) play Misreadings was included in Best American Short Plays, 1996–7. She was nominated for an Emmy Award for Outstanding Children's Program in 1994 for  Clarissa Explains it All. Nearly a dozen of her plays have been included in compilations, in addition to those that have been published separately.

Her play Jump/cut was performed in 2006 at the Julia Miles Theater in New York. Her comedy Hard Feelings was performed at the Women's Project Theater in 2000.

Selected works
 A Common Vision. New York: Samuel French, 2009. 
 Tomorrowland. New York: Samuel French, 2009. 
 The Dew Point. New York: Samuel French, 2009. 
 Jump/cut. New York, N.Y: Samuel French, 2007.

References

External links

Neena Beber at DariaWiki

Living people
American women dramatists and playwrights
American television producers
American women television producers
American women screenwriters
Year of birth missing (living people)
21st-century American women